Guzmán or de Guzmán ( or ) is a Spanish surname. The Portuguese language equivalent is Gusmão.

Origins
The surname is of toponymic origin, de Guzmán ("of Guzmán"), deriving from the village of Guzmán (es) in the region of Burgos. The earliest individual documented using this surname was Rodrigo Muñoz de Guzmán, who first appears in a document from 1134 and was the founder of the noble House of Guzmán.

In the Philippines, Canada and the United States the name usually becomes Guzman (without acute accent), while the Portuguese form of the name is Gusmão.

Coats of arms of Guzmán

People with the surname 
People with this surname include:

A–D
 Abimael Guzmán (1934–2021), Peruvian founder of the communist group Shining Path
 Adriana Guzmán (born 1992), Mexican tennis player
 Alejandra Guzmán (born 1968), Mexican singer
 Aleth Guzman-Nageotte (1904–1978), French sculptor and numismatist
 Alonso Pérez de Guzmán "el Bueno" (1256–1309), Spanish nobleman
 Alonso Pérez de Guzmán, 7th Duke of Medina Sidonia (1550–1615), commander-in-chief of the Spanish Armada
 Juan Pérez de Guzmán, 1ºth Duke of Medina Sidonia, (1494+), commander of army of Andalusia in Spain. 
 Ángel Guzmán (born 1981), Venezuelan baseball pitcher
 Antonia García de Videgain born Antonia García F. de Guzmán, (1850-1924), actress and singer.
 Antonio Guzmán (disambiguation), multiple people, including:
Antonio Guzmán Blanco (1829–1899), president of Venezuela
Antonio Guzmán Fernández (1911–1982), president of the Dominican Republic
Antonio Guzmán Núñez (born 1953), Spanish footballer
Antonio Jose Guzman (born 1971), Dutch Panamanian artist
 Agustín Guzmán (died 1849), Commander in Chief of Los Altos
 Augusto Ibáñez Guzmán (1958 - 2018), Colombian lawyer and academic
 Black Guzmán (1916–1973), Mexican professional wrestler
 Coco Guzmán (born 1979), Spanish visual artist
 Cristian Guzmán (born 1978), Dominican baseball shortstop
 Daniel Guzmán (born 1965), Mexican football player and manager
 Daniela Guzmán, Ecuadorian singer and composer
 David Guzmán (born 1990), Costa Rican footballer
 Del de Guzman (born 1963), Filipino politician
 Delfina Guzmán (born 1928), Chilean actress
 Domingo Guzmán (born 1975), Dominican baseball pitcher
 Saint Dominic de Guzmán (1170–1221), Castilian priest and founder of the Dominican Order

E–H
 Efraín Guzmán (c. 1937–2002), Colombian guerrilla leader
 Eleanor de Guzmán (1310–1351), Castilian royal mistress
 Elizabeth Guzman, Elected official in Virginia, U.S.
 Enrique Guzmán (born 1943), Mexican singer
 Éver Guzmán (born 1988), Mexican footballer
 Fernando Guzmán Solórzano (1812–1891), President of Nicaragua (1867–1871)
 Felipe S. Guzmán (1879–1932), President of Bolivia (1925–1926)
 Federica Guzmán, (born 1981) Venezuelan TV Host, model and beauty pageant titleholder
 Fernán Pérez de Guzmán (1376–1458), Castilian nobleman, historian and genealogist
 Francisco de Tello de Guzmán (died 1603), Spanish Governor of the Philippines
 Freddy Guzmán (born 1981), Dominican baseball outfielder
 Gaspar de Guzmán, Count-Duke of Olivares (1587–1645), Spanish court favorite and minister
 Gastón Guzmán (1932–2016), Mexican mycologist and anthropologist

J
 Jack Guzman (born 1975), Colombian-born American actor
 Jaime Guzmán (1946–1991), Chilean lawyer and senator, founder of the Independent Democratic Union
 Javier Guzmán (1945–2014), Mexican football defender
 Jered Guzman (born 1981), American pair skater
 Jesús Guzmán (born 1984), Venezuelan baseball player
 Joan Guzmán (born 1976), Dominican boxer in super featherweight division
 Joaquín Guzmán, nicknamed 'El Chapo' (born 1954 or 1957), Mexican drug trafficker
 Joaquín Eufrasio Guzmán (1801–1875), politician and President of El Salvador
 Joel Guzmán (born 1984), Dominican baseball player
 Jonathan de Guzmán (born 1987), Canadian-born footballer, playing for Dutch national team
 Jorge Guzmán (born 1963), Mexican professional wrestler better known as El Hijo del Santo
 José Guzmán (disambiguation), multiple people, including:
José Guzmán (born 1963), Puerto Rican baseball player
José Guzmán (boxer) (born 1963), Venezuelan boxer
José Guzmán Santos (born 1947), Mexican politician
José Florencio Guzmán (1929–2017), Chilean politician
José de Guzmán, 1st Viscount of San Rafael de la Angostura (1740–1792), Dominican cattle rancher, colonizer and nobleman
José de Guzmán Benítez (1857–1921), Mayor of Ponce, Puerto Rico
 Josep Maria Guzmán (born 1984), Spanish basketball player
 Juan Guzmán (disambiguation), multiple people, including
Juan Guzmán (baseball) (born 1966), Dominican baseball pitcher
Juan José Guzmán (1800–1847), President of El Salvador, 1842–1844
Juan Pablo Guzmán (born 1981), Argentinian tennis player
Juan Reynoso Guzmán (born 1969), Peruvian football defender
Juan de Guzmán (died 1569), post-Conquest tlatoani (ruler) of the state of Coyoacan in the Valley of Mexico
Juan Guzmán Tapia (1939–2021), Chilean judge
Juan Guzman (soccer) (born 1988), American soccer player
Juan Guzmán (photographer) (1911–1982), German born Mexican photographer
Juan Guzman (boxer) (1951–2021), Dominican boxer
 Julian de Guzman (born 1981), Canadian footballer

K–W
 Karel Guzmán (born 1995), Cuban basketball player
 Klarisse de Guzman, runner-up of The Voice of the Philippines (season 1) in 2013
 Lucía Guzmán, American politician from Colorado
 Leody de Guzman (born 1959), Filipino labor leader and activist
 Luis Guzmán (disambiguation), multiple people, including:
Luis Guzmán (born 1956), Puerto Rican actor
Luis Enríquez de Guzmán, 9th Count of Alba de Liste (born c. 1605), viceroy of New Spain and Peru
Luis Muñoz de Guzmán (1735–1808), Spanish colonial administrator
Luis Roberto Guzmán (born 1966), Puerto Rican actor
 Luisa de Guzmán (1613–1666), Spanish noblewoman
 Manuel Guzmán (born 1969), Puerto Rican swimmer
 Martha Guzmán Partida, Mexican mathematician
 Nahuel Guzmán (born 1986), Argentine football goaltender
 Noel Guzmán Boffil Rojas (1954–2021), Cuban painter
 Nuño de Guzmán (c. 1490–1558), Spanish conquistador
 Ovidio Guzmán López (born 1990), Mexican drug lord
 Pancho Guzmán (born 1946), Ecuadorian tennis player
 Patricio Guzmán (born 1941), Chilean documentary film maker
 Pedro Guzman (also Peter Guzman), US citizen illegally deported to Mexico in 2007
 Ralph Guzman (born 1980), Filipino news correspondent
 Ramon Guzman (born 1982), American player of Canadian football
 Ramón Guzmán, (1907–1954), Spanish football player and manager
 Raúl González Guzmán (born 1985), Venezuelan footballer
 Rigoberto Guzmán (1932–2014), Salvadoran football player and manager
 Rodolfo Guzmán (1917–1984), Mexican professional wrestler and actor better known as Santo
 Ronald Guzmán (born 1994), Dominican baseball player
 Ryan Guzman (born 1987), American actor
 Suzanna Guzmán, American opera singer
 Tomás Guzmán (born 1982), Paraguayan footballer
 Vanessa Guzmán (born 1976), Mexican actress and model
 Víctor Guzmán (born 1995), Mexican footballer
 Viviana Guzmán (born 1982), Chilean flautist
 William Guzmán (born 1994), Mexican footballer

People with the given name
Guzmán has also rarely been used as a given name. Notable people with the given name Guzmán include:

 Guzmán Casaseca (born 1984), Spanish football midfielder
 Guzmán Pereira (born 1991), Uruguayan football midfielder

Notes

References

Spanish-language surnames